The 1975 UC Davis Aggies football team represented the University of California, Davis as a member of the Far Western Conference (FWC) during the 1975 NCAA Division II football season. Led by sixth-year head coach Jim Sochor, UC Davis compiled an overall record of 7–3 with a mark of 5–0 in conference play, winning the FWC title for the fifth consecutive season. 1974 was the sixth consecutive winning season for the Aggies. With the 5–0 conference record, they stretched their conference winning streak to 13 games dating back to the 1973 season. The team outscored its opponents 245 to 142 for the season. The Aggies played home games at Toomey Field in Davis, California.

Schedule

NFL Draft
The following UC Davis Aggies players were selected in the 1976 NFL Draft.

References

UC Davis
UC Davis Aggies football seasons
Northern California Athletic Conference football champion seasons
UC Davis Aggies football